There are a number of communist parties active in various countries across the world and a number that used to be active. They differ not only in method, but also in strict ideology and interpretation, although they are generally within the tradition of Marxism–Leninism.

The formation of communist parties in various countries was first initiated by the Russian Bolsheviks within the Communist International. Since then, communist parties have governed numerous countries, whether as ruling parties in one-party states like the Communist Party of China or the Communist Party of the Soviet Union, or as ruling parties in multi-party systems, including majority and minority governments as well as leading or being part of several coalitions.

Many other communist parties did not govern any country, but did govern a state or region within a country. Others have also been represented in national, state, or regional parliaments. Some communist parties and schools of thought reject parliamentarism, instead advocating insurrection or social revolution as well as workers' councils.

Officially ruling in communist states 
In the following countries, communist parties either lead the ruling coalition or hold monopoly on state power as defined by their respective country's constitutions.

Ruling or part of ruling coalition in multi-party states

Main opposition in multi-party states

Formerly ruling

One-party system

Parliamentary majority or minority government

Coalition partner or supporter 
  (2005–2009, 2013–2014, 2021–2022) – Communist Party of Bulgaria, in coalition government as member of the Coalition for Bulgaria
  (1944–1948, 1966–1970, 1970–1971, 1975–1976 and 1977–1982) – Finnish People's Democratic League, in coalition governments with numerous other parties
  (1981–1989; 1997–2002) – French Communist Party as a part of the Union de la gauche and of the Gauche plurielle
  (2004–2008) – Communist Party of India (Marxist) and Communist Party of India, in the coalition government of the United Progressive Alliance
  (1946) – Tudeh Party of Iran, in the coalition government of Ahmad Qavam
  (1998–2001, 2006–2008) – Party of Italian Communists in the D'Alema I Cabinet, D'Alema II Cabinet, Amato II Cabinet with The Olive Tree; Communist Refoundation Party and Party of Italian Communists in the coalition government of The Union
  (2005–2014) – Malian Party of Labour, participated in the Alliance for Democracy in Mali
  (1945) – Communist Party of Norway in coalition government as member of Gerhardsen's First Cabinet led by the Labour Party
  (2011–2016) – Peruvian Communist Party, in coalition governments as member of Peru Wins
  (2015–2019) – Portuguese Communist Party in support of the XXI Constitutional Government of Portugal led by the Socialist Party
  (1945–1957, 1978–1992) – Sammarinese Communist Party, in coalition government with Sammarinese Socialist Party
  (1970–1975, 1994–2000, 2004–2015 and 2020–2022) – Communist Party of Sri Lanka and Lanka Sama Samaja Party, in coalition governments with numerous other parties
  (2005–2020) – Communist Party of Uruguay and People's Victory Party, in coalition governments as members of the Broad Front

Modern non-ruling 

 All-Union Communist Party, All-Union Communist Party (Bolsheviks), Communist Party of the Soviet Union, Bolshevik Platform of the KPSS[17]

Formerly communist

Defunct

Once ruling

Non-ruling 
  – Armenian Workers Communist Party, Armenian Workers Union, Marxist Party of Armenia, Union of Communists of Armenia, Renewed Communist Party of Armenia
  – Communist Party of Australia
 - Workers Party of Barbados
  – Union of Marxist–Leninist Communists of Belgium, founded in 1970
  – Communist Party of Belgium – Marxist–Leninist, founded in 1976.
  – Free Homeland Party
  – Bulgarian Communist Party – Marxists
  – African Independence Party (Burkina Faso), Burkinabé Bolshevik Party, Burkinabé Communist Group, Marxist–Leninist Group, Organization for Popular Democracy – Labour Movement, Party for Democracy and Socialism, Party of Labour of Burkina, Patriotic League for Development, Union of Burkinabé Communists, Union of Communist Struggles, Union of Communist Struggles – Reconstructed, Union of Communist Struggles – The Flame, Voltaic Communist Organization
  – Labor-Progressive Party (legal front of the Communist Party of Canada from 1943 to 1959), Workers' Communist Party of Canada
  Channel Islands – Jersey Communist Party
  – Chilean Communist Party (Proletarian Action), Revolutionary Left Movement
  – Workers Revolutionary Party of Colombia
  – Costa Rican People's Party
  – Communist Party of Cyprus
  – Popular Socialist Party, joined Cuban Communist Party
  – Communist Party of El Salvador, merged into the FMLN
  – Swaziland Communist Party
  – Gambia Socialist Revolutionary Party
  – Revived Communist Party of Georgia, Georgian Workers Communist Party
  – Spartacist League formed in 1918 and became the Communist Party of Germany
  – Socialist Unity Party of West Berlin, Communist Party of Germany (banned 1956 in West Germany)
  – Guatemalan Party of Labour, merged into the URNG
  – Haitian Communist Party, Haitian Workers Party, Unified Party of Haitian Communists, merged into the National Reconstruction Movement in 1990
  – Communist Party of Honduras, merged into the Patriotic Renewal Party
  – Communist Party of Iceland, Communist Party of Iceland (Marxist–Leninist)
  – Indian Communist Party (Sen)
  – Communist Party of Indonesia
  – Communist Party of Ireland (Marxist–Leninist)
  – Leninist Group in the Iraqi Communist Movement
  – Maki (1948–1973) split in 1965 with formation of largely Arab Rakah which changed its name to Maki in 1989
  – Communist Party of Italy, Italian Communist Party of the Julian March, Marxist–Leninist Italian Communist Party, Marxist–Leninist Revolutionary Party of Italy, Movement for Peace and Socialism, Movement for the Confederation of the Communists
  – Lebanese People's Party
  – Malayan Communist Party, North Kalimantan Communist Party
  – Mexican Communist Party
  – Communist Reformers Party of Moldova
  – Communist Party (Burma)
  – Communist Party of Namibia
  - New Caledonian Communist Party
  – Communist Party of the Netherlands merged into the GroenLinks in 1989, marxist-leninist dissidents within the party formed the NCPN in 1992.
  – Communist Party of New Zealand, Socialist Unity Party
  – Nigerian Communist Party, Socialist Workers and Farmers Party of Nigeria
  – Workers' Party of North Korea
  – Workers' Communist Party merged into the Red Party
  – Communist Party of Palestine (1921–1948)
  – Communist Party of Poland
  – Communist Party in Saudi Arabia
  – Workers' Party of South Korea
  – Party of Labour Basel, founded in 1944
  – Taiwanese Communist Party, China Communist Alliance, Communist Party of the Republic of China, Taiwan Democratic Communist Party
  – Communist Party of the Republic of Tatarstan
  – Communist Party of Thailand
  (unrecognized country) – Communist Party of Pridnestrovie
  Trieste – Communist Party of the Free Territory of Trieste, merged into the Italian Communist Party
  – Communist Party of Trinidad and Tobago
  – Communist Party of Great Britain, Communist Party of Scotland
  – Communist Party Marxist–Leninist, May 19th Communist Movement, Communist Workers Party, Black Panther Party, Communist Labor Party of America, International Socialist Organization

Left communist organizations by country 
The following is a list of left communist organizations by country which list only those political organizations and parties who officially call themselves left communist ideologically and still exist.

Organisations

See also
 List of communist parties represented in European Parliament
 List of socialist parties with national parliamentary representation
 List of democratic socialist parties and organizations
 List of left-wing political parties

Notes

References

External links 
 Leftist Parties of the World (last updated 4 October 2006)
 Communist States animation (1850–2016)

Communist